Use Your Illusion is a 1998 compilation album by American rock band Guns N' Roses, drawing from the Use Your Illusion I and II studio albums. It was only released in the United States, and was primarily sold at Walmart and Kmart, two retail outlets that refused to stock the unedited Use Your Illusion I and II due to explicit lyrics.

Overview
"Knockin' on Heaven's Door" appears in an edited version without Josh Richman's speech, removed for unknown reasons. Therefore, the track length is reduced to 5:20, instead of 5:36 from the version included on Use Your Illusion II. Richman's speech was instead included in the Greatest Hits compilation album.

The cover art of the album simply combines the color schemes from the covers of Use Your Illusion I and Use Your Illusion II, which were originally designed by Mark Kostabi. Like the original two, the image is a detail of the Raphael painting "The School of Athens".

Track listing

Use Your Illusion I
 "Live and Let Die" (Paul McCartney, Linda McCartney) – 3:04
 "Don't Cry (Original)" (Axl Rose, Izzy Stradlin) – 4:44
 "You Ain't the First" (Stradlin) – 2:36
 "November Rain" (Rose) – 8:57
 "The Garden" (Rose, West Arkeen, Del James) – 5:22
featuring Alice Cooper
 "Dead Horse" (Rose) – 4:17

Use Your Illusion II
"Civil War" (Rose, Slash, Duff McKagan) – 7:42
 "14 Years" (Rose, Stradlin) – 4:21
 "Yesterdays" (Rose, Arkeen, James, Billy McCloud) – 3:16
 "Knockin' on Heaven's Door" (Bob Dylan) – 5:20
 "Estranged" (Rose) – 9:23
 "Don't Cry (Alternate Lyrics)" (Rose, Stradlin) – 4:43

Personnel

Guns N' Roses
W. Axl Rose – lead vocals, piano, choir and synthesizer programming on "November Rain", acoustic guitar on "Dead Horse", backing vocals on "You Ain't The First" and "14 Years"
Slash – lead guitar, acoustic and slide guitar on "The Garden", dobro on "You Ain't The First", acoustic guitar on "Civil War"
Izzy Stradlin – rhythm guitar, backing vocals, acoustic guitar on "You Ain't The First", lead vocals on "You Ain't the First" and "14 Years"
Duff McKagan – bass guitar, backing vocals, acoustic guitar on "You Ain't The First", percussion
Matt Sorum – drums, backing vocals, choir on "November Rain"
Dizzy Reed – keyboards, piano, organ on "Yesterdays", backing vocals

Additional Personnel
Steven Adler – drums on "Civil War"
Shannon Hoon – backing vocals on tracks 1, 2, 4, 5 & 12
Alice Cooper – lead vocals on "The Garden"
Johann Langlie – programming on "November Rain", "Live And Let Die"
Reba Shaw, Stuart Bailey – backing vocals on "November Rain"
Jon Thautwein, Matthew McKagan, Rachel West, Robert Clark – horn on "Live and Let Die"
West Arkeen – acoustic guitar on "The Garden"
Mike Clink – nutcracker on "Dead Horse"
The Waters – backing vocals on "Knockin' on Heaven's Door"
Tim Doyle – tambourine on "You Ain't the First"

References

1998 compilation albums
Guns N' Roses compilation albums
Albums produced by Mike Clink
Geffen Records compilation albums

id:Use Your Illusion II